Arge captiva is a species from the genus Arge. This species was originally described by Franz von Paula Schrank in 1802

References

Argidae
Insects described in 1802
Taxa named by Franz von Paula Schrank